Roar may refer to:

Film and television
 Roar (film), an American adventure-comedy film starring Tippi Hedren and Melanie Griffith
 Roar: Tigers of the Sundarbans, a 2014 Hindi-language Indian animal horror feature film
 Roar (1997 TV series), a television drama set in 4th century Ireland
 Roar (2006 TV series), a CBBC television series about the animals in a zoo
 Roar (2022 TV series), an anthology series on Apple TV+ based on Cecilia Ahern's short story collection

Music
 "Roar" (song), a 2013 song by Katy Perry
 Rrröööaaarrr, a 1986 album by Voivod
 "Roar", a 2013 song by Axwell and Sebastian Ingrosso from the soundtrack of Monsters University
 "Roar", a 2010 song by Treat from the album Coup De Grace
 "Roar!", a 2008 instrumental by Michael Giacchino from the film Cloverfield

Print
 ROAR Magazine, an independent online publication
 Roar! (newspaper), the King's College London student newspaper
 The Roar, a 2008 novel by Emma Clayton
 Roar (short story collection), a 2018 short story collection by Cecelia Ahern

Acronyms
 Radio Operated Auto Racing, the sanctioning body of competitive radio controlled car racing in the United States and Canada
ROAR National Championships
 ROAR Registry of Open Access Repositories, an index and search engine
 Restore Our Alienated Rights, a Boston organization formed to oppose desegregation busing
 Rise Organise and Rebuild Guyana, a political party in Guyana
 Reach Out and Read, an American organization that advocates for childhood literacy

People
 Roar (given name), a masculine Norwegian given name
 Roar (Dane), a Danish woman in the Gesta Danorum
 Roar, a dubious legendary king of Denmark; see Hrothgar

Other uses
 Roar (vocalization), a sound produced by certain animals
 Roar (roller coaster), at Six Flags America and formerly Six Flags Discovery Kingdom
 The Roar (website), an Australian sports opinion site
 Brisbane Roar FC, an Australian football club (formerly Queensland Roar FC)

See also
 Curling, also known as "the roaring game"